Junior Karamoko (born 12 June 1994) is an Ivorian football striker.

References

1994 births
Living people
Ivorian footballers
US Monastir (football) players
Stade Gabèsien players
Horoya AC players
Association football forwards
Tunisian Ligue Professionnelle 1 players
Ivorian expatriate footballers
Expatriate footballers in Tunisia
Ivorian expatriate sportspeople in Tunisia
Expatriate footballers in Guinea
Ivorian expatriate sportspeople in Guinea
FC San-Pédro players